A Gentle Night (小城二月 Xiao Cheng Er Yue) is a 2017 Chinese short film written and directed by Qiu Yang. It won the Short Film Palme d'Or at the 2017 Cannes Film Festival.

Plot
In a nameless small Chinese city, a distressed mother desperately tries to find her missing teenaged daughter throughout the night

The film is set in Changzhou, Jiangsu, China.

Cast
Li Shuxian as Cai Zhuo

Reception
The film won the Short Film Palme d'Or at the 2017 Cannes Film Festival, and received an honorable mention for the Best International Short Film award at the 2017 Toronto International Film Festival.

References

Chinese short films
2017 short films
Short Film Palme d'Or winners
Films set in Jiangsu